Braunbeck is a German surname. Notable people with the surname include:

Gary A. Braunbeck (born 1960), American writer
Werner Braunbeck (1901–1977), German physicist

German-language surnames